Lalmuni Chaubey (6 September 1942 – 25 March 2016) was a member of the 14th Lok Sabha, the lower house of the Parliament of India. He represented the Buxar constituency  of Bihar for four consecutive terms as a member of the Bharatiya Janata Party (BJP), having previously sat as a  member of the Legislative Assembly of Bihar from 1972.

He died at AIIMS in Delhi.

References

External links
 Home Page on the Parliament of India's Website

1942 births
2016 deaths
People from Kaimur district
India MPs 2004–2009
People from Buxar district
India MPs 1996–1997
India MPs 1998–1999
India MPs 1999–2004
Lok Sabha members from Bihar
Members of the Bihar Legislative Assembly
People from Bhabua
Bharatiya Janata Party politicians from Bihar